"" (Kerneveg ; ; "") is the anthem of Brittany. It is sung to the same tune as that of the national anthem of Wales, "Hen Wlad Fy Nhadau", and has similar lyrics. The Cornish anthem, "Bro Goth Agan Tasow", is also sung to the same tune.

This anthem is played during major sporting events at the final of the Coupe de France between the Stade Rennais F.C. and the En Avant Guingamp, at the end of a day's broadcasting on the local radio station Bretagne 5, as well as cultural events.

History
The Breton lyrics are the creation of François Jaffrennou (Taldir) in 1897, and the music was that composed by James James, of Pontypridd, Wales, for "Hen Wlad Fy Nhadau". The new song was first published in 1898 and circulated as "Henvelidigez" ("Adaptation"). It was chosen as the national anthem (and a song to celebrate friendship between the Welsh and Bretons) in 1903, at a Congress of the Union Régionaliste Bretonne held in Lesneven, Brittany (France). Maurice Duhamel adapted it for piano, and it was first recorded by Pathé in 1910.

In November 2021, it became the official anthem of Brittany with a new arrangement by Frédérique Lory played by the Orchestre National de Bretagne (National Orchestra of Brittany) in partnership with Comité Bro Gozh ma Zadoù and Coop Breizh.

Lyrics

Notes

References

Further reading
 Jean-Yves Carluer, « Bro Goz ma Zadou, ou Doue ha va bro ? Retour sur une controverse ». In Langues de l'Histoire, Langues de la Vie. Mélanges offerts à Fañch Roudaut, Brest, Les Amis de Fañch Roudaut, 2005, 
 Jean Ollivro, « Bro gozh ma zadou : l'identité territoriale bretonne ». In Bretagne 2100 : Identité et avenir, Presses Universitaires de Rennes, 2001, 
 Sion T. Jobbins, The Welsh National Anthem: Its story, its meaning. Y. Lolfa, 2013

External links
Entre traditions et modernité (Between Traditions and Modernity) on the website of Région Bretagne (in French).
Bro Gozh ma Zadoù (2021 arrangement) by Gilles Servat and Aziliz Manrow, with the National Orchestra of Brittany.
Bro Gozh ma Zadoù by Nolwenn Leroy in 2014 at the Stade de France.

1897 songs
Breton nationalism
Breton culture
Breton songs
Celts
Cultural regions
National anthem compositions in E-flat major